Hwamyeong Station is a station on the Busan Metro Line 2 in Hwamyeong-dong, Buk District, in the northwestern part of Busan, South Korea. It was one of the first stations opened on the line in 1999.

On August 25, 2014, the station suffered severe damage due to flooding brought by the Korean monsoon season, causing a section of the subway line from Gumyeong Station to Hopo Station to shut down temporarily.

References

External links

  Cyber station information from Busan Transportation Corporation

Busan Metro stations
Buk District, Busan
Railway stations in South Korea opened in 1999